Savage Night is a 1953 novel by the thriller writer Jim Thompson.

Plot
Charles Bigger is small of stature and in bad health, but his youthful career as a hit man was phenomenally successful. He has spent recent years living quietly in Arizona, where the climate is good for his tuberculosis. Summoned back to New York by a mob boss, known simply as The Man, Bigger travels to the small town of Peardale under the alias Carl Bigelow. His mission is to kill Jake Winroy, an ex-bookmaker who has agreed to turn informant against The Man's crime establishment.

References

External links
Savage Night at Google Books

1953 American novels
Novels by Jim Thompson
Novels set in New York (state)
American crime novels
English-language novels